Daniel Anthony Turk (June 25, 1962 – December 24, 2000) was an American football center and long snapper in the National Football League (NFL) for the Pittsburgh Steelers, Tampa Bay Buccaneers, Oakland Raiders, and Washington Redskins. He played college football at the University of Wisconsin–Madison.

Early years
Turk attended James Madison High School. He accepted a football scholarship from Drake University. He transferred to the University of Wisconsin–Madison after his sophomore season. 

As a junior, he started every game at center as part of an offensive line that also included future NFL players Jeff Dellenbach, Kevin Belcher and Bob Landsee. As a senior, he received UPI second-team All-Big Ten honors.

Professional career

Pittsburgh Steelers
Turk was selected by the Pittsburgh Steelers in the 4th round (101st overall) of the 1985 draft. He also was selected by the Jacksonville Bulls in the 1985 USFL Territorial Draft. As a rookie, he missed all but one game during the season with a right broken wrist.

In 1986, he started the season opener against the  Seattle Seahawks in place of an injured Mike Webster, who had a streak of 150 consecutive games starts come to an end, while recovering from a dislocated elbow. He would also start the next 3 games in place of an injured Webster. On April 13, 1987, he was traded to the Tampa Bay Buccaneers in exchange for a sixth-round draft choice (#141-Tim Johnson).

Tampa Bay Buccaneers
In 1987, after the NFLPA strike was declared on the third week of the season, those contests were canceled (reducing the 16 game season to 15) and the NFL decided that the games would be played with replacement players. He crossed the picket line to be a part of the Buccaneer replacement team for the sixth game against the Minnesota Vikings. He was the only regular Buccaneer player to cross the picket line, that didn't need to receive treatment for injuries (3 other players had this situation). He had one start at center and 2 at guard during the season.

In 1988, he started 10 games at right guard. On June 6, 1989, he was declared a free agent, after the Buccaneers withdraw their contract offer.

Oakland Raiders
In June 1989, he signed as a free agent with the Los Angeles Raiders. He started 5 games at center.

In 1995, as a result of a training camp injury to Don Mosebar, Turk became the fourth starting center in Raider history. That year, he started all 16 games, between Steve Wisniewski at left guard and Kevin Gogan at right guard, for a team finishing with a won-lost record of 8-8, Mike White's first year as head coach.

Washington Redskins
On July 7, 1997, he signed as a free agent with the Washington Redskins to be the long snapper, becoming along with his brother Matt Turk, the first brother-to-brother snapper-punter combination in NFL history.

In 1999, in his final season with the Redskins and in the NFL, Turk botched several snaps during the regular season. During his last game, a divisional round contest of the 1999–2000 NFL playoffs against his former club, the Buccaneers, he dribbled the snap to holder Brad Johnson, that could have resulted in a game-winning 51-yard field goal. He was not re-signed after the season.  It was later revealed that during these later games, he had been playing with a large, malignant tumor in his chest due to undiagnosed mediastinal germ cell tumors.

Personal life
On December 24, 2000, Turk died from testicular cancer at age 38 after being diagnosed earlier that year in April. He is survived by his wife Peggy Turk, and his daughter, Sara Turk. His brother is former NFL punter Matt Turk. Dan also represented his brother in contract negotiations as his agent.

References

1962 births
2000 deaths
Players of American football from Milwaukee
American football centers
American football long snappers
Drake Bulldogs football players
Wisconsin Badgers football players
Pittsburgh Steelers players
Tampa Bay Buccaneers players
Oakland Raiders players
Los Angeles Raiders players
Washington Redskins players
Deaths from cancer in Virginia
Deaths from testicular cancer